Auzouville-sur-Ry is a commune in the Seine-Maritime department in the Normandy region in north-western France.

Geography

Heraldry

Population

Places of interest
 The château of Lesques, dating from the seventeenth century.
 The church of Notre-Dame, dating from the seventeenth century.

See also
Communes of the Seine-Maritime department

References

Communes of Seine-Maritime